Christianity is the largest religion in Seychelles with around 89.2% of its population following it. A majority of them are Roman Catholic (76%) followed by Anglicans (6%). Hinduism is the largest minority and the largest non-Christian with 2.4% of its population following it. Other Christian groups include Baptists, Seventh-day Adventists, Assemblies of God, the Pentecostal Church, the Pentecostal Assembly, Nazarites, Eastern Orthodox Church and Jehovah's Witnesses. Islam, Baháʼí Faith and Buddhism also have sizeable number of adherents in the country. 

The initial settlers in Seychelles were Roman Catholics, and the country has remained so, despite ineffective British efforts to establish Protestantism in the islands during the nineteenth century. The nation has been a bishopric since 1890, and mission schools had a virtual monopoly on education until the government took over such schools in 1944. Sunday masses are well attended, and religious holidays are celebrated throughout the nation both as opportunities for the devout to practice their faith and as social events. Practicing Catholicism, like speaking French, historically conferred a certain status by associating its adherents with the settlers from France. 

Approximately 6% of Seychellois are Anglicans, most coming from families converted by missionaries in the late 19th and early 20th century. Evangelical Protestant churches are active and growing, among them Pentecostals and Seventh-day Adventists. Some 5.1% of the population are adherents of other faiths, including Hinduism 2.4%, Islam 1.6%, the Baháʼí Faith and others non-Christian 1.1%. A Hindu temple and mosque exist on Mahé. No restrictions are imposed on religious worship by any of the denominations, and tax-free status is granted by the government. 

Although the clergy and the civil authorities disapprove, many Seychellois see little inconsistency between their orthodox religious observance and belief in magic, witchcraft, and sorcery. It is not uncommon to consult a local seer—known as a bonom di bwa—for fortune-telling or to obtain protective amulets or charms, called gri-gri, to bring harm to enemies.

See also
 Hinduism in Seychelles
 Islam in Seychelles
 Roman Catholicism in Seychelles

References